In mathematics, a geometric algebra is a specific algebraic structure. The term is also used as a blanket term for the theory of geometric algebras.

Geometric algebra may also refer to:

 Algebraic geometry
 Algebraic geometry and analytic geometry
 Analytic geometry
 %C3%89l%C3%A9ments de g%C3%A9om%C3%A9trie alg%C3%A9brique, a 1960-7 book by Alexander Grothendieck
 Clifford algebra
 Geometric Algebra (book), a 1957 book by Emil Artin
 Greek geometric algebra